Pierre de Chelles was a French architect from the late 13th and early 14th centuries. He was one of the architects of the Notre-Dame de Paris Cathedral. He completed the choir began in 1300, the high flying buttresses above the apse, and the building of the rood screen. He was also a sculptor.

De Chelles was related to Jean de Chelles, who was his father or uncle.

Work 
Pierre de Chelles was also the author of the tomb effigy of Philip III of France (1245–1285).

References

External links 
 Pierre de Chelles on Encyclopédie Universalis

14th-century French architects